Azcapotzalco was a Mexican municipality. It was disestablished in 1928, when the municipalities of the Federal District were replaced by boroughs (delegaciones). There is now a borough of the same name.

1928 disestablishments
Former municipalities of the Mexican Federal District
Azcapotzalco